Shou-Wu Zhang (born October 9, 1962) is a Chinese-American mathematician known for his work in number theory and arithmetic geometry. He is currently a Professor of Mathematics at Princeton University.

Biography

Early life
Shou-Wu Zhang was born in Hexian, Ma'anshan, Anhui, China on October 9, 1962. Zhang grew up in a poor farming household and could not attend school until eighth grade due to the Cultural Revolution. He spent most of his childhood raising ducks in the countryside and self-studying mathematics textbooks that he acquired from sent-down youth in trades for frogs. By the time he entered junior high school at the age of fourteen, he had self-learned calculus and had become interested in number theory after reading about Chen Jingrun's proof of Chen's theorem which made substantial progress on Goldbach's conjecture.

Education
Zhang was admitted to the Sun Yat-sen University chemistry department in 1980 after scoring poorly on his mathematics entrance examinations, but he later transferred to the mathematics department after feigning color blindness and received his bachelor's degree in mathematics in 1983. He then studied under analytic number theorist Wang Yuan at the Chinese Academy of Sciences where he received his master's degree in 1986. In 1986, Zhang was brought to the United States to pursue his doctoral studies at Columbia University by Dorian M. Goldfeld. He then studied under Goldfeld, Hervé Jacquet, Lucien Szpiro, and Gerd Faltings, and then completed his PhD at Columbia University under Szpiro in 1991.

Career
Zhang was a member of the Institute for Advanced Study and an assistant professor at Princeton University from 1991 to 1996. In 1996, Zhang moved back to Columbia University where he was a tenured professor until 2013. He has been a professor at Princeton University since 2011 and is an Eugene Higgins Professor since 2021. 

Zhang is on the editorial boards of: Acta Mathematica Sinica, Algebra & Number Theory, Forum of Mathematics, Journal of Differential Geometry, National Science Review, Pure and Applied Mathematics Quarterly, Science in China, and Research in Number Theory. He has previously served on the editorial boards of: Journal of Number Theory, Journal of the American Mathematical Society, Journal of Algebraic Geometry, and International Journal of Number Theory.

Research
Zhang's doctoral thesis Positive line bundles on Arithmetic Surfaces  proved a Nakai–Moishezon type theorem in intersection theory using a result from differential geometry already proved in Tian Gang's doctoral thesis. In a series of subsequent papers, he further developed his theory of 'positive line bundles' in Arakelov theory which culminated in a proof (with Emmanuel Ullmo) of the Bogomolov conjecture.

In a series of works in the 2000s, Zhang proved a generalization of the Gross–Zagier theorem from elliptic curves over rationals to modular abelian varieties of GL(2) type over totally real fields. Eventually,  established a full generalization of the Gross–Zagier theorem to all Shimura curves.

In arithmetic dynamics,  posed conjectures on the Zariski density of non-fibered endomorphisms of quasi-projective varieties and  proposed a dynamical analogue of the Manin–Mumford conjecture.

In 2018,  proved the averaged Colmez conjecture which was shown to imply the André–Oort conjecture for Siegel modular varieties by Jacob Tsimerman.

Awards
Zhang has received a Sloan Foundation Research Fellowship (1997) and a Morningside Gold Medal of Mathematics (1998). He is also a Clay Foundation Prize Fellow (2003), Guggenheim Foundation Fellow (2009), Fellow of the American Academy of Arts and Sciences (2011), and Fellow of the American Mathematical Society (2016). He was also an invited speaker at the International Congress of Mathematicians in 1998.

Selected publications

Arakelov theory
.
.
.
.
.
.

Bogomolov Conjecture
.
.

Gross--Zagier formulae
.
.
.
.
.
.

Arithmetic dynamics
.
.

References

External links
 Princeton home page
 

1962 births
Living people
21st-century American mathematicians
Arithmetic geometers
Columbia University alumni
Columbia University faculty
Educators from Anhui
Fellows of the American Academy of Arts and Sciences
Fellows of the American Mathematical Society
Mathematicians from Anhui
People from Ma'anshan
Princeton University faculty
Sun Yat-sen University alumni
Academic staff of Tsinghua University
Chinese emigrants to the United States
Institute for Advanced Study visiting scholars
20th-century Chinese mathematicians